Paul Mutambuze (born 11 November 1964) is a Ugandan table tennis player. He competed in the men's singles event at the 1996 Summer Olympics.

References

1964 births
Living people
Ugandan male table tennis players
Olympic table tennis players of Uganda
Table tennis players at the 1996 Summer Olympics
Place of birth missing (living people)